Terry Bell may refer to:

 Terry Bell (baseball) (born 1962), American baseball player
 Terry Bell (footballer) (1944–2014), English footballer